Spring Glacier is a glacier flowing from the northeast portion of Royal Society Range between Stoner Peak and Transit Ridge, joining the Blue Glacier drainage south of Granite Knolls, in Victoria Land. Named in 1992 by Advisory Committee on Antarctic Names (US-ACAN) after Thomas E. Spring, civil engineer, United States Geological Survey (USGS); leader of the USGS two man astronomic surveying team to South Pole Station and Byrd Station in the 1969-70 field season. The team provided support to various science projects, established the position of the Geographic South Pole (previously done 1956), and established a tie to the Byrd Ice Strain net which had been under study for several years.

References

Glaciers of Scott Coast